Thioridazine (Mellaril or Melleril) is a first generation antipsychotic drug belonging to the phenothiazine drug group and was previously widely used in the treatment of schizophrenia and psychosis. The branded product was withdrawn worldwide in 2005 because it caused severe cardiac arrhythmias. However, generic versions are still available in the US.

Indications
Thioridazine was voluntarily discontinued by its manufacturer, Novartis, worldwide because it caused severe cardiac arrhythmias.

Its primary use in medicine was the treatment of schizophrenia. It was also tried with some success as a treatment for various psychiatric symptoms seen in people with dementia, but chronic use of thioridazine and other anti-psychotics in people with dementia is not recommended.

Side effects

Thioridazine prolongs the QTc interval in a dose-dependent manner. It produces significantly less extrapyramidal side effects than most first-generation antipsychotics, likely due to its potent anticholinergic effect. Its use, along with the use of other typical antipsychotics, has been associated with degenerative retinopathies (specifically retinitis pigmentosa). It has a higher propensity for causing anticholinergic side effects coupled with a lower propensity for causing extrapyramidal side effects and sedation than chlorpromazine, but also has a higher incidence of hypotension and cardiotoxicity. It is also known to possess a relatively high liability for causing orthostatic hypotension compared to other antipsychotics. Similarly to other first-generation antipsychotics it has a relatively high liability for causing prolactin elevation. It is moderate risk for causing weight gain. As with all antipsychotics thioridazine has been linked to cases of tardive dyskinesia (an often permanent neurological disorder characterised by slow, repetitive, purposeless and involuntary movements, most often of the facial muscles, that is usually brought on by years of continued treatment with antipsychotics, especially the first-generation (or typical) antipsychotics such as thioridazine) and neuroleptic malignant syndrome (a potentially fatal complication of antipsychotic treatment). Blood dyscrasias such as agranulocytosis, leukopenia and neutropenia are possible with thioridazine treatment. Thioridazine is also associated with abnormal retinal pigmentation after many years of use.
Thioridazine has been correlated to rare instances of clinically apparent acute cholestatic liver injury.

Pharmacology

Thioridazine has the following binding profile:

Note: The Binding affinities given are towards cloned human receptors unless otherwise specified

Acronyms used
HB – Human brain receptor
RC – Cloned rat receptor
ND – No data

Metabolism
Thioridazine is a racemic compound with two enantiomers, both of which are metabolized, according to Eap et al., by CYP2D6 into (S)- and (R)-thioridazine-2-sulfoxide, better known as mesoridazine, and into (S)- and (R)-thioridazine-5-sulfoxide. Mesoridazine is in turn metabolized into sulforidazine. Thioridazine is an inhibitor of CYP1A2 and CYP3A4.

History
The manufacturer Novartis/Sandoz/Wander of the brands of thioridazine, Mellaril in the US and Canada and Melleril in Europe, discontinued the drug worldwide in June 2005.

Antibiotic activity

Thioridazine is known to kill extensively drug-resistant tuberculosis and to make methicillin-resistant Staphylococcus aureus sensitive to β-lactam antibiotics. A possible mechanism of action for the drug's antibiotic activity is via the inhibition of bacterial secretion pumps. The β-lactam antibiotic resistance is due to the secretion β-lactamase a protein that destroys antibiotics. If the bacteria cannot secrete the β-lactamase, then the antibiotic will be effective. The drug has been successfully used in the treatment of granulomatous amoebic encephalitis in conjunction with more conventional amoebicidal medications.

Synthesis
Note: Same sidechain used for Mesoridazine, & Sulforidazine.

The alkylation of 2-Picoline [109-06-8] (1) with formaldehyde gives 2-Pyridineethanol [103-74-2] (2). Forming the quat salt with methyl iodide [74-88-4] leads to 2-(2-hydroxyethyl)-1-methyl-pyridinium iodide [56622-15-2] (3). Catalytic hydrogenation in the presence of hydrochloric acid leads to 2-(2-Chloroethyl)-1-Methylpiperidine [50846-01-0] (4). Alkylation of 2-Methylthiophenothiazine [7643-08-5] (5) in the presence of sodium hydride base completed the synthesis of Thioridazine (6).

References

Further reading

External links 
 
 Antipsychotic Mellaril Removed from Market Schizophrenia Daily News Blog.

Alpha-1 blockers
CYP2D6 inhibitors
Novartis brands
Phenothiazines
Piperidines
Prodrugs
Tertiary amines
Thioethers
Typical antipsychotics